The 2007–08 Frölunda HC season began with the retirement of goaltender Tommy Salo.

Nordic Trophy

Standings

Game log

Group stage

Final

Elitserien

Standings

Game log

Playoffs
Frölunda ended the 2007–08 regular season as the sixth seed team.

Quarterfinals: vs. (4) Färjestad BK
Frölunda lost series 3–4

Season stats

Scoring leaders

Transactions

Drafted players 

Frölunda HC players picked at the 2008 NHL Entry Draft in Ottawa, Ontario, Canada, in June 2008.

References

General

Footnotes 

2007-08
2007–08 in Swedish ice hockey